The 1938–39 New York Rangers season was the franchise's 13th season. New York finished second in the NHL in regular season points with 58, and qualified for the playoffs. In the league semi-finals, the Rangers lost to the Boston Bruins in seven games.

Regular season

Final standings

Record vs. opponents

Schedule and results

|- align="center" bgcolor="#CCFFCC"
| 1 || 13 || @ Detroit Red Wings || 4–3 || 1–0–0
|- align="center" bgcolor="#CCFFCC"
| 2 || 15 || Detroit Red Wings || 2–0 || 2–0–0
|- align="center" bgcolor="#CCFFCC"
| 3 || 17 || @ Chicago Black Hawks || 1–0 || 3–0–0
|- align="center" bgcolor="#CCFFCC"
| 4 || 20 || Montreal Canadiens || 2–1 || 4–0–0
|- align="center" bgcolor="#FFBBBB"
| 5 || 22 || @ Boston Bruins || 4–2 || 4–1–0
|- align="center" bgcolor="#CCFFCC"
| 6 || 24 || Toronto Maple Leafs || 6–2 || 5–1–0
|- align="center" bgcolor="#FFBBBB"
| 7 || 27 || Chicago Black Hawks || 1–0 || 5–2–0
|-

|- align="center" bgcolor="#CCFFCC"
| 8 || 4 || @ New York Americans || 6–1 || 6–2–0
|- align="center" bgcolor="#CCFFCC"
| 9 || 8 || @ Montreal Canadiens || 6–5 || 7–2–0
|- align="center" bgcolor="#FFBBBB"
| 10 || 11 || Boston Bruins || 3–0 || 7–3–0
|- align="center" bgcolor="white"
| 11 || 15 || New York Americans || 1 – 1 OT || 7–3–1
|- align="center" bgcolor="#CCFFCC"
| 12 || 17 || @ Toronto Maple Leafs || 3–2 || 8–3–1
|- align="center" bgcolor="#FFBBBB"
| 13 || 18 || @ Chicago Black Hawks || 5–0 || 8–4–1
|- align="center" bgcolor="#CCFFCC"
| 14 || 20 || Detroit Red Wings || 6–2 || 9–4–1
|- align="center" bgcolor="#CCFFCC"
| 15 || 22 || @ Montreal Canadiens || 5–2 || 10–4–1
|- align="center" bgcolor="#CCFFCC"
| 16 || 25 || @ Boston Bruins || 1–0 || 11–4–1
|- align="center" bgcolor="#FFBBBB"
| 17 || 26 || Toronto Maple Leafs || 2–0 || 11–5–1
|- align="center" bgcolor="#CCFFCC"
| 18 || 31 || Boston Bruins || 2 – 1 OT || 12–5–1
|-

|- align="center" bgcolor="#CCFFCC"
| 19 || 2 || Detroit Red Wings || 3–0 || 13–5–1
|- align="center" bgcolor="white"
| 20 || 5 || @ Montreal Canadiens || 2 – 2 OT || 13–5–2
|- align="center" bgcolor="#CCFFCC"
| 21 || 8 || New York Americans || 5–2 || 14–5–2
|- align="center" bgcolor="#FFBBBB"
| 22 || 10 || @ New York Americans || 1 – 0 OT || 14–6–2
|- align="center" bgcolor="#CCFFCC"
| 23 || 12 || Chicago Black Hawks || 6–0 || 15–6–2
|- align="center" bgcolor="white"
| 24 || 15 || @ Chicago Black Hawks || 1 – 1 OT || 15–6–3
|- align="center" bgcolor="#FFBBBB"
| 25 || 19 || @ Detroit Red Wings || 4–3 || 15–7–3
|- align="center" bgcolor="#CCFFCC"
| 26 || 22 || Montreal Canadiens || 7–3 || 16–7–3
|- align="center" bgcolor="#FFBBBB"
| 27 || 26 || New York Americans || 1–0 || 16–8–3
|- align="center" bgcolor="#CCFFCC"
| 28 || 31 || Chicago Black Hawks || 3–2 || 17–8–3
|-

|- align="center" bgcolor="#CCFFCC"
| 29 || 2 || @ New York Americans || 7–0 || 18–8–3
|- align="center" bgcolor="#CCFFCC"
| 30 || 4 || @ Toronto Maple Leafs || 4–2 || 19–8–3
|- align="center" bgcolor="white"
| 31 || 5 || Toronto Maple Leafs || 5 – 5 OT || 19–8–4
|- align="center" bgcolor="#FFBBBB"
| 32 || 9 || Boston Bruins || 4–2 || 19–9–4
|- align="center" bgcolor="#CCFFCC"
| 33 || 12 || @ Boston Bruins || 3–2 || 20–9–4
|- align="center" bgcolor="#CCFFCC"
| 34 || 16 || New York Americans || 2–1 || 21–9–4
|- align="center" bgcolor="#FFBBBB"
| 35 || 18 || @ Toronto Maple Leafs || 2–1 || 21–10–4
|- align="center" bgcolor="#CCFFCC"
| 36 || 21 || Detroit Red Wings || 7–3 || 22–10–4
|- align="center" bgcolor="#CCFFCC"
| 37 || 23 || @ Detroit Red Wings || 4–2 || 23–10–4
|- align="center" bgcolor="white"
| 38 || 25 || @ Montreal Canadiens || 1 – 1 OT || 23–10–5
|- align="center" bgcolor="#FFBBBB"
| 39 || 26 || Montreal Canadiens || 3–0 || 23–11–5
|-

|- align="center" bgcolor="#FFBBBB"
| 40 || 2 || Chicago Black Hawks || 3–1 || 23–12–5
|- align="center" bgcolor="#FFBBBB"
| 41 || 5 || @ Boston Bruins || 5 – 3 OT || 23–13–5
|- align="center" bgcolor="white"
| 42 || 7 || Montreal Canadiens || 2 – 2 OT || 23–13–6
|- align="center" bgcolor="#CCFFCC"
| 43 || 9 || @ Chicago Black Hawks || 8–3 || 24–13–6
|- align="center" bgcolor="#FFBBBB"
| 44 || 12 || Boston Bruins || 4–2 || 24–14–6
|- align="center" bgcolor="#FFBBBB"
| 45 || 14 || @ Detroit Red Wings || 3–2 || 24–15–6
|- align="center" bgcolor="#CCFFCC"
| 46 || 16 || @ New York Americans || 11–5 || 25–15–6
|- align="center" bgcolor="#FFBBBB"
| 47 || 18 || @ Toronto Maple Leafs || 2–1 || 25–16–6
|- align="center" bgcolor="#CCFFCC"
| 48 || 19 || Toronto Maple Leafs || 6–2 || 26–16–6
|-

Playoffs

Key:  Win  Loss

Player statistics
Skaters

Goaltenders

†Denotes player spent time with another team before joining Rangers. Stats reflect time with Rangers only.
‡Traded mid-season. Stats reflect time with Rangers only.

References

New York Rangers seasons
New York Rangers
New York Rangers
New York Rangers
New York Rangers
Madison Square Garden
1930s in Manhattan